The Breithorn (German for literally "broad horn"; 13,661 ft. or 4,164 m) is a mountain range of the Pennine Alps with its highest peak of the same name (but also called Breithorn (Western Summit)), located on the border between Switzerland and Italy. It lies on the main chain of the Alps, approximately halfway between the Matterhorn and Monte Rosa and east of the Theodul Pass. Most of the massif is glaciated and includes several subsidiary peaks, all located east of the main summit: the Central Breithorn, the western Breithorn Twin (or Eastern Breithorn), the Gendarm (or eastern Breithorn Twin) and the Roccia Nera. The main summit is sometimes distinguished by the name Western Breithorn. The nearest settlements are Zermatt (Valais) and St-Jacques (Aosta Valley).

The Breithorn is considered the most easily climbed 4,000 m Alpine peak. This is due to the Klein Matterhorn cable car which takes climbers to over 3,820 m (12,700 ft) from Zermatt for a starting point. The standard route (SSW flank) is from the Italian side of the mountain (the south side) and continues over a glacial plateau before climbing to the summit on a 35 degree snow slope. However, inexperienced mountaineers may run into severe difficulty if caution is not taken near cornices or in bad weather. For experienced climbers wanting more of a challenge, the half traverse of the Breithorn crest is another option.

The Breithorn was first climbed in 1813 by Henry Maynard (climber), Joseph-Marie Couttet, Jean Gras, Jean-Baptiste Erin and Jean-Jacques Erin.

See also

List of 4000 metre peaks of the Alps

References

External links

 Breithorn on SummitPost
 Breithorn on Peakware - photos
 Breithorn on 4000er.de
 Breithorn on WinterClimb.com - photos, practical info

Alpine four-thousanders
Four-thousanders of Switzerland
International mountains of Europe
Italy–Switzerland border
Mountains of Italy
Mountains of Switzerland
Mountains of the Alps
Mountains of Valais
Pennine Alps